Justine Maree Caines OAM (born 21 February 1973) was a lobbyist and advocate in Australia. Justine passed away aged 49 yrs following a 14 month battle with glioblastoma on 12 September 2022.

Activism
Justine Caines was National President of Maternity Coalition, the national umbrella organization for maternity lobbying in Australia from 2003–05 and 2008–09.  She was the National Co-ordinator of Homebirth Australia from 2001–2006 and secretary from 2006–10. She was also National Advocacy Advisor for Maternity Coalition.  In 2007 she founded What Women Want, a political party. What Women Want aims to give Australian women a greater voice in decision making and bring a broad social policy framework back on the agenda. The party gained approx 60,000 votes in the 2007 election, but did not run candidates in 2010. Instead Caines supported 4 independent candidates in key seats, Robertson, Macquarie, Dickson and Corangamite. The votes received in Corangamite were pivotal to the formation of the minority Gillard Government .
Caines received the Order of Australia Medal in the 2011 Australia Day Awards for "service to the community, particularly in the area of women's health, maternity care and education."

References

ABC Sunday Profile with Monica Attard

Notes

1973 births
Living people
Australian women activists
Australian feminists
Australian women in politics